East Springfield is a neighborhood located in Springfield, Massachusetts.

East Springfield sits along Springfield's northern border, with easy access to I-291 and the Mass Turnpike (I-90) East Springfield, and like Liberty Heights, it is a residential neighborhoods full of a variety of 20th century housing types, such as: Craftsman, Colonial Revival, Tudor Revival, Capes, and Ranches. East Springfield has a branch library that offers a wide variety of family activities.

East Springfield is home to some of the city's largest employers, such as Smith & Wesson. The neighborhood is also close to Elms College in Chicopee.

References

Neighborhoods in Springfield, Massachusetts